Guido Fontana (1490 – 1576), was an Italian maiolica maker and the father of Orazio Fontana.

Biography
Fontana was born in 1490 in Castel Durante. He moved to Urbino, where set up shop there when he called himself Fontana. He bought a house with a potter's oven in Borgo di S. Paolo, Urbino.

Fontana designed a maiolica service for Anne de Montmorency in 1535. A candlestick from the service is at the Victoria and Albert Museum.

Fontana changed his surname to Durantino in 1553. He died in 1576 in Urbino.

References

External links
Guido Fontana on Artnet

1490 births
1576 deaths
16th-century Italian painters
Italian male painters
People from Urbino
Italian potters